Chyzne may refer to:
Chyżne, Poland
Chyžné, Slovakia